Nemcha Kipgen is an Indian politician and member of the Bharatiya Janata Party. Kipgen is a member of the Manipur Legislative Assembly from the Kangpokpi constituency from Bharatiya Janata Party since 2017. She was the Minister of Social Welfare and Cooperation (2017-2020) in First Biren Singh ministry Government. She was sworn in as Cabinet Minister For Textile, Commerce and Industry and Co-operation Department in Second N. Biren Singh ministry.

References 

Year of birth missing (living people)
Living people
People from Kangpokpi district
Bharatiya Janata Party politicians from Manipur
Women members of the Manipur Legislative Assembly
Manipur MLAs 2017–2022
21st-century Indian women politicians
21st-century Indian politicians
Manipur MLAs 2022–2027